Madoda Sambatha (born 22 October 1975) is a South African politician serving as the North West MEC for Health since 2018. He has served as a Member of the North West Provincial Legislature for the African National Congress (ANC) since 2014. He was the MEC for Public Works and Roads from 2014 to 2017. Sambatha is also the provincial secretary of the South African Communist Party (SACP).

Early life and education
Sambatha was born on 22 October 1975 in Kwangqondo, Engcobo, in the Cape Province, now the Eastern Cape. He attended Sentube Junior Primary School, Tshapile Junior Secondary School and graduated from Mzikayise Dalasile Senior Secondary School in 1995.

Political career
Sambatha later found employment as a mineworker at the Mponeng Gold Mine in 1996. He then joined the National Union of Mineworkers. He was involved in the politics of Gauteng and the North West. In 2000, Sambatha was elected as a councillor of the West Rand District Municipality in Gauteng. He was appointed Mayoral Committee Member for Public Safety and served in the post until 2005. 
  
At the same time, he was elected as an ANC Youth League Regional Executive Committee member in the West Rand, before being elected as a member of the youth league's regional executive in the Dr Kenneth Kaunda Region in the North West.

In 2007, Sambatha was elected the provincial secretary of SACP.

Sambatha was elected to the North West Provincial Legislature in the 2014 general election that was held on 7 May and took office as an MPL on 21 May. Premier Supra Mahumapelo appointed him Member of the Executive Council for Roads and Public Works. He was sworn in on 27 May.

On 1 June 2017, Mahumapelo removed Sambatha from the Executive Council. Mahumapelo reasoned that allegations of Sambatha selling land illegally led to his demotion, yet his dismissal was speculated to have partisan undertones. Mmule Maluleke was appointed his successor.

In December 2018, newly elected premier Job Mokgoro named him the MEC for Health. He succeeded long-serving Magome Masike. He remained in the post following the 2019 general election.

Personal life
Sambatha is married to Phumza Sambatha; they have five children.

References

External links

Face to face with North West Health MEC Madoda Sambatha – Spotlight

Living people
1975 births
People from the Eastern Cape
People from Gauteng
People from North West (South African province)
20th-century South African politicians
21st-century South African politicians
African National Congress politicians
South African Communist Party politicians
Politicians from Gauteng
Members of the North West Provincial Legislature
People from Dr Kenneth Kaunda District Municipality
People from the West Rand District Municipality